Gasolin' Forever is a double-CD  from 1999 that contains two previously released albums: Rabalderstræde Forever (1991) and  the live album Derudaf Forever (1993).

Track list

Disc one: Rabalderstræde Forever
 "Langebro" (from their debut album)
 "På banen" (from Gasolin' 2)
 "Det var Inga, Katinka og Smukke Charlie på sin Harley" (from Gasolin' 3)
 "Se din by fra tårnets top" (from Gasolin' 2)
 "Kap Farvel til Umanarssuaq" (from Stakkels Jim)
 "Rabalderstræde" (from Gas 5)
 "Kvinde min" (from Gas 5)
 "Pilli Villi" (from Efter endnu en dag)
 "Stakkels Jim" (from Stakkels Jim)
 "Længes hjem" (from Gør det noget)
 "Sirenesangen" (from Efter endnu en dag)
 "Kloden drejer stille rundt" (Efter endnu en dag)
 "Pas på svinget i Solrød" (Efter endnu en dag)
 "Uh-Lu-La-Lu" (non album track)
 "Masser af succes" (from Gas 5)
 "Get On The Train" (from Gør det noget)
 "Strengelegen" (from Gør det noget)
 "Hva' gør vi nu, lille du" (from Live sådan)
 "Jumbo nummer nul" (from Gør det noget)
 "Det bedste til mig og mine venner" (from Gør det noget)
 "Som et strejf af en dråbe" (non album track)

Disc two: Derudaf Forever

 "Kina Rock"
Tivoli 19 February 1978
 "Nanna"
Holstebro 24 January 1976
 "Smukke Linda"
Holstebro 24 January 1976
 "Det Bedste til Mig og Mine Venner"
Oslo 10 August 1978
 "Get on the Train"
Greve 13 February 1978
 "Hvad Gør Vi Nu, Lille Du"
Oslo 10 August 1978
 "1975"
Holstebro 24 January 1976
 "Pas på Svinget i Solrød"
Helsingborg 20 August 1978
 "På Banen (Derudaf)"
Holstebro 24 January 1976
 "Jumbo Nummer Nul"
Greve 13 February 1978
 "December i New York"
Tivoli 19 February 1978
 "Kattemor"
Oslo 10 August 1978
 "Kloden Drejer Stille Rundt"
Oslo 10 August 1978
 "Fi-Fi-Dong"
Tivoli 19 February 1978
 "Strengelegen"
Helsingborg 20 August 1978
 "Girl You Got Me Lonely"
Tivoli 19 February 1978
 "Refrainet er Frit"
Tivoli 19 February 1978
 "Som et Strejf af en Dråbe"
Tivoli 19 February 1978

Credits

Gasolin'

Franz Beckerlee - guitar, moog, e-bow, vocals
Wili Jønsson - bass, vocals, piano
Kim Larsen - vocals, guitar, piano
Søren Berlev - drums, vocals

Certifications

References

Gasolin' compilation albums
1999 compilation albums
Columbia Records compilation albums

da:Gør det noget